The 1972–73 UCLA Bruins men's basketball team went undefeated again at  and claimed a seventh consecutive national championship.

In the title game of the NCAA tournament at St. Louis, junior center Bill Walton scored 44 points (21 of 22 field goal attempts) with thirteen rebounds as the top-ranked Bruins defeated #12 Memphis State,  Some regard this as the greatest ever offensive performance in American college basketball. Tied at 39 at halftime, the Bruins dominated the second half and outscored the Tigers, 

Roster

Starting lineup
{|class="wikitable" style="text-align:center; font-size:95%;"
!Position
!Player    
!Class
|-
|F
|align=left|Larry Farmer
|Senior
|-
|F
|align=left|Keith Wilkes
|Junior
|-
|C
|align=left|Bill Walton
|Junior
|-
|G
|align=left|Larry Hollyfield
|Senior
|-
|G
|align=left|Greg Lee
|Junior
|}

Schedule

|-
!colspan=9 style=|Regular Season

|-
!colspan=12 style="background:#;"| NCAA Tournament

Notes
 The 1972 team was ranked No. 1 by both AP and UPI pre-season polls
 Walton set a school record with 506 rebounds
 Larry Farmer and Larry Hollyfield became the only players to have the best winning record over a three-year period, 89–1.
 In the semifinal against #6 Indiana, the Hoosiers rallied in the second half to give the Bruins a scare. Curtis scored 22 points off the bench to help UCLA with the 70–59 victory.
 Walton and Keith Wilkes were consensus first team All-Americans.

Awards and honors
 Bill Walton, James E. Sullivan Award, which recognizes the top amateur athlete in the United States
 Bill Walton, USBWA College Player of the Year
 Bill Walton, Naismith College Player of the Year
 Bill Walton, Adolph Rupp Trophy

References

External links

1972–73 UCLA Bruins at Sports-Reference.com

Ucla Bruins
UCLA Bruins men's basketball seasons
NCAA Division I men's basketball tournament championship seasons
NCAA Division I men's basketball tournament Final Four seasons
Ucla
UCLA
UCLA